Ictalurid herpesvirus 1 (IcHV-1) is a species of virus in the genus Ictalurivirus, family Alloherpesviridae, and order Herpesvirales. It causes disease in channel catfish and blue catfish, and can cause significant economic loss in catfish farms. The disease is endemic in the USA and there are reports of the virus in Honduras and Russia.

Pathology

Clinical signs 
Transmission is both horizontal and vertical. Reservoirs of disease are clinically affected fish and recovered covert carriers. Disease occurs in fish less than a year old that weigh less than 10 grams. The critical environmental factor is water temperature with the disease occurring during warm weather. Outbreaks are normally seen only in farmed fish. Affected fish have pot-bellied appearance, haemorrhages on the fins and musculature and exopthalmos. Affected fish seem off balance and tend to swim erratically or close to the surface, and eventually sinking to the bottom. Fish that survive the infection have lifelong protective immunity but remain latent carriers of the virus. This is a significant source of disease for vulnerable fish. Increased mortality in young catfish during warm weather, especially after stress, is suggestive of Ictalurid herpesvirus 1.

Diagnosis 
The virus can be detected in water containing infected fish and organs of diseased fish by virus neutralisation, fluorescent antibody testing, ELISA, or PCR. FAT and ELISA should be used for diagnosis of clinically infected fish while virus neutralisation or PCR should be used to detect carrier fish. Lesions are seen on the liver, kidney and many other internal organs both histologically and grossly on postmortem examination.

Treatment and control 
There is no available treatment. Stress and high stocking-densities should be avoided to reduce disease occurrence. Appropriate quarantine and hygiene measures should be employed to prevent spread of disease. The virus is sensitive to acidic pH, heat, and UV light, and is inactivated by pond mud and sea water.

References 

Alloherpesviridae
Fish viral diseases